Factor analysis of mixed data
Mala Mala Airport, ICAO airport code FAMD